The Centenary Bridge is a motorway crossing of the Brisbane River.
As it forms part of Brisbane's Centenary Motorway, it is used primarily by vehicular traffic, although it includes footpaths for pedestrian traffic.

Built to service the new Centenary Suburbs of Jindalee, Mount Ommaney and Westlake, the original two lane bridge opened in 1964. It was financed by the developers of the suburbs, LJ Hooker.

The bridge was duplicated to two lanes each way as part of an upgrade of the Centenary Highway and Western Freeway south of Mount Cootha Road. The works were officially opened by Russell Hinze, Minister for Main Roads, on 27 March 1987.

During the 1974 floods, the bridge was badly damaged when a barge rammed into its upstream side. The barge blocked the flow of floodwaters under the bridge and there were real fears that the bridge would collapse. The barge was deliberately holed using explosives and allowed to sink to reduce the floodwater pressure on the bridge. When the floodwater receded, the barge was refloated and beached downstream near Fig Tree Pocket to be cut up for scrap. The damage sustained by the bridge required its partial closure for repairs. For two years after the floods, the bridge was reduced to a single lane, with one way traffic controlled by traffic lights at each end of the bridge.

New Duplicate Bridge 
A project to duplicate the Centenary Bridge to three lanes each way, at a cost of $298 million, is due to commence construction in 2023.

References

External links

 
 Photo of the barge collision

Bridges in Brisbane
Bridges over the Brisbane River
Road bridges in Queensland
Bridges completed in 1964
Beam bridges
Concrete bridges in Australia